V-type proton ATPase 116 kDa subunit a isoform 4 is an enzyme that in humans is encoded by the ATP6V0A4 gene.

Function 

This gene encodes a component of vacuolar ATPase (V-ATPase), a multisubunit enzyme that mediates acidification of intracellular compartments of eukaryotic cells. V-ATPase dependent acidification is necessary for such intracellular processes as protein sorting, zymogen activation, receptor-mediated endocytosis, and synaptic vesicle proton gradient generation. V-ATPase is composed of a cytosolic V1 domain and a transmembrane V0 domain. The V1 domain consists of three A and three B subunits, two G subunits plus the C, D, E, F, and H subunits. The V1 domain contains the ATP catalytic site. The V0 domain consists of five different subunits: a, c, c', c'', and d. This gene is one of four genes in man and mouse that encode different isoforms of the a subunit. Alternatively spliced transcript variants encoding the same protein have been described. Mutations in this gene are associated with renal tubular acidosis associated with preserved hearing.

Interactions 

ATP6V0A4 has been shown to interact with PFKM.

References

External links

Further reading